Petru Gabriel Florescu (born 4 January 1999 in Bucharest) is a Romanian racing driver.

Career
Petru made his karting debut in 2007, aged 8. In 2015, he made his debut in the UK-based MSA Formula series, from Carlin, finishing sixth in his second season. In December 2016, Petru was listed among the drivers partaking in GP3 post-season testing with Campos Racing. The following month, Campos signed him to their Euroformula Open division. A month later, Florescu was signed to Douglas Motorsport for the BRDC British Formula 3 Championship.

Racing record

Career summary

Motorsports career results

Complete FIA Formula 3 European Championship results
(key) (Races in bold indicate pole position) (Races in italics indicate fastest lap)

Complete Toyota Racing Series results 
(key) (Races in bold indicate pole position) (Races in italics indicate fastest lap)

References

External links
  
 

1999 births
Living people
Romanian racing drivers
Sportspeople from Bucharest
British F4 Championship drivers
Euroformula Open Championship drivers
FIA Formula 3 European Championship drivers
Toyota Racing Series drivers
Carlin racing drivers
Karting World Championship drivers
Formula Renault Eurocup drivers
BRDC British Formula 3 Championship drivers
Teo Martín Motorsport drivers
AV Formula drivers
Campos Racing drivers
Drivex drivers
Motopark Academy drivers
Fortec Motorsport drivers